Jeziorany formerly known in Polish as Zybork, is a town in Olsztyn County, Warmian-Masurian Voivodeship, Poland, with 3,411 inhabitants (2004).

References

Cities and towns in Warmian-Masurian Voivodeship
Olsztyn County